The Kraton Kacirebonan is the oldest Kraton (sultan's palace) in the Indonesian city of Cirebon.
It has existed since 1807. This colonial building has housed many historical relics such as Keris, Wayang puppets, war equipment, Gamelan instruments and others.
Kacirebonan in the area of the District Pulasaren Pekalipan village, exactly 1 kilometer southwest of Kasepuhan Palace and approximately 500 meters south of Keraton Kanoman. Kraton Kacirebonan is positioned from north to south (as are the other palaces in Cirebon) with a land area of about 46,500 square meters.

History
History begins when Prince Sultan Kacirebonan King Kanoman, heir to the throne of the Sultanate Kanoman joined the people of Cirebon in rejecting taxes applied by Holland. Application of these taxes led to the revolt of the people in some places.
As a result, Prince Raja Kanoman was captured by the Dutch and thrown into the fortress Viktoria in Ambon, stripped of his title, as well as deprived as Sultan Kanoman. However, because the resistance of the people of Cirebon had not abated, the Dutch finally brought back Prince King Kanoman to Cirebon to end the insurgency. Prince Raja Kanoman's aristocratic status was returned, but the rights to the Sultanate Kanoman remained revoked.
Upon his return to Cirebon in 1808, Prince Raja Kanoman lived in the complex and the title of Sultan Cave Sunyaragi Amiril Mukminin Sultan Muhammad Khaerudin or Carbon despite not having the palace. Until his death in 1814, Sultan Carbon remained consistent with its stance and reject pension from the Netherlands. Carbon is the wife of the late Sultan was named queen of King Resminingpuri who later built the palace Kacirebonan using pension money from the Netherlands.

Establishment of Cirebon Sultanate (1522-1677) is closely related to the presence of the Sultanate of Demak.
Sultanate of Cirebon was established in 1552 by the commander of the sultanate of Demak, then the Sultan of Cirebon died in 1570 and was succeeded by his son who was very young at the time. Based on the news of the pagoda Gutters and Semarang, the leading founder of Cirebon Sultanate is considered synonymous with the founding figures of the Sultanate of Banten, Sunan Gunung Jati.
Sultan of the Sultanate of Cirebon:
 1479-1568: Sunan Gunung Jati
 1568-1570: Fatahillah
 1570-1649: Panembahan Ratu I
 1649-1677: Panembahan Ratu II

Disunity I, in 1677
The first division of the Sultanate of Cirebon, thus occurred during the crowning of three sons of Panembahan Girilaya: Sultan Sepuh, Sultan Anom, and Panembahan Cirebon in 1677. This is a new chapter for the palace of Cirebon, in which the empire was split into three and each ruling and lowers the next emperor. Thus, the next ruler of Cirebon Sultanate are:
 Sultan Palace Kasepuhan, Prince Martawijaya, with the title Sultan Muhammad Samsudin Makarimi Sepuh Abil (1677-1703)
 Sultan Kanoman, Prince Kartawijaya, with the title Sultan Muhammad Badrudin Makarimi Anom Abil (1677-1723)
 Prince Wangsakerta, as Panembahan Cirebon with the title of Prince Abdul Kamil Muhammad Nasarudin or Panembahan Tohpati (1677-1713). Prince Wangsakerta not appointed but only Panembahan sultan. He does not have jurisdiction or the palace itself but stands as Kaprabonan is a place to learn the intellectual palace.

Disunity II, in 1807, the founding Kacirebonan
Succession of the sultan Cirebon generally went smoothly, until the reign of Sultan Anom IV (1798-1803), where there was a split because one of his sons, namely Prince Raja Kanoman, want to secede to build the empire itself as the Sultanate Kacirebonan.
The will of the Prince King Kanoman supported by the Dutch colonial government to release Besluit (Dutch: decree) Governor-General of the Dutch East Indies who raised Prince Raja Kanoman became Sultan Carbon Kacirebonan in 1807 with the restriction that the sons and successors are not entitled to the title of sultan, simply by the title of prince. Since it's in Cirebon Sultanate increased by one ruler again, the Sultanate Kacirebonan, a fraction of the Sultanate Kanoman. While the throne of Sultan Kanoman V falls on the son of Sultan Anom IV else named Sultan Anom Abusoleh Imamuddin (1803-1811).
Kacirebonan palace was built in 1807 during the second split of the Sultanate.
The succession of the sultans Generally went smoothly, until the reign of Sultan Anom IV (1798-1803), when the split occurred, one of his sons Because items, namely Prince Raja Kanoman, wanted to build his Sultanate, the Sultanate of Kacirebonan named.

The main building
The architecture and interior of the kraton are a blend of Sundanese, Javanese, Islamic, Chinese, Dutch styles with European architecture.
After the death of Sultan Kacirebonan I Sultan Cerbon Commander of the Faithful in 1814, the queen of King Resminingpuri who is the consort of the late Sultan Kacirebonan I live in the area of Taman Sari Cave Sunyaragi, but by having a young child and was only five said Prince Raja Madenda Hidayat which later became Sultan Kacirebonan II, he decided to build a palace Kacirebonan in Pulosaren with pensioners money that had been rejected. At the beginning of construction of the palace of Queen King Resminingpuri Kacirebonan make the main building of the palace, Paseban and mosque.

Culture

During its early formation years, the sultanate actively promoted Islam. Cirebon sent their ulamas to proselytise Islam into inland West Java. Together with Banten, it is credited for the Islamization of Sundanese people in West Java as well as coastal Java. Because the sultanate located on the border of Javanese and Sundanese cultural realms, the Sultanate of Cirebon demonstrate both aspects, reflected in its art and architecture, also in their language. The Sultanate Pakungwati palace shows the influence of Majapahit red brick masonry architecture. The styles and title of its officials also influenced by Javanese Mataram courtly culture.

As a port city, Cirebon attracts settlers from around and overseas alike. Cirebon culture was described as Java Pasisiran (coastal) culture, similar to those of Banten, Batavia, Pekalongan, and Semarang, with notable influences mixture of Chinese, Arabic-Islamic, and European influences. The notable one is Cirebon batik with vivid colours with motifs and patterns that demonstrate Chinese and local influences. Chinese influences can be seen in Cirebon's culture, most notably the Cirebon batik Megamendung pattern that resembles Chinese cloud imagery.

Some of the royal symbols of Cirebon Sultanate describe their legacy and influences. The banner of Cirebon Sultanate is called "Macan Ali" (Ali's panther) with Arabic calligraphy arranged to resemble a panther or tiger, describe both Islamic influence and also Hindu Pajajaran Sundanese King Siliwangi tiger banner. The royal carriage of Kasepuhan's Singa Barong and Kanoman's Paksi Naga Liman carriage resembles the chimera of three animals; eagle, elephant, and dragon, to symbolize Indian Hinduism, Arabic Islam, and Chinese influences. The images of Macan Ali, Singa Barong and Paksi Naga Liman also often featured as a pattern in Cirebon batik.

The remnants of Cirebon sultanate; Kasepuhan, Kanoman, Kaprabonan, and Kacirebonan Keratons are now run as a cultural institution to preserve Cirebon culture. Each still held their traditional ceremonies and become the patrons of Cirebon arts. Topeng Cirebon mask dance, inspired by Javanese Panji cycles is one of notable Cirebon traditional dance and quite famous within Indonesian dances. Although did not hold real political power any more, the royal lineage of Cirebon still well respected and held in high prestige among the people of Cirebon.

Tourism
The Kacirebonan palace complex of buildings along with four other palaces namely, Kasepuhan palace, palace Kanoman and Kaprabonan were set to be vital objects which must be protected. The assessment was based on the consideration of the police, with the assessment that the local police are required to put personnel on guard at each of the palaces, including the palace Kanoman.

Rulers of Kraton Kacirebonan
 Pangeran Arya Cirebon, Kamaruddin (1697–1723) Son of Sultan Sepuh I
 Sultan Cirebon I Muhammad Akbaruddin (1723–1734) Son
 Sultan Cirebon II Muhammad Salihuddin (1734–1758) Brother
 Sultan Cirebon III Muhammad Harruddin (1758–1768) Nephew
 Sultan Cirebon IV (1808–1810; died in 1814) Son of Sultan Anom III

See also

 List of monarchs of Java
 Sultanate of Cirebon
 Cirebonese
 History of Indonesia
 List of palaces in Indonesia

Further reading 

  Guillot, Claude (1990). The Sultanate of Banten. Gramedia Book Publishing Division. p. 17.
 Guillot, Claude (1990). The Sultanate of Banten. Gramedia Book Publishing Division. p. 18.
 Schoppert, P., Damais, S., Java Style, 1997, Didier Millet, Paris, pp. 46–47, 
 Stokvis (1888); Sulendraningrat (1985); Sunardjo (1996), p. 81.

References

Cirebon
Tourist attractions in West Java
Cirebon
Islamic states in Indonesia
Palaces in Java
Cultural Properties of Indonesia in West Java
Buildings and structures in Cirebon